Western Wall: The Tucson Sessions is a 1999 duet album by American singer, songwriter, and producer Linda Ronstadt and singer, songwriter, and guitarist Emmylou Harris, who had previously collaborated on two albums with Dolly Parton.

The album was well received critically, and it made several year-end Top Ten lists. The disc was recorded at the Arizona Inn in Tucson, Arizona.

This album hit #6 on Billboards Country albums chart and #73 on Billboard's main album chart. The two artists teamed for a concert tour in support of the disc in late 1999. It was nominated for several Grammy Awards.

Track listing

Personnel

Linda Ronstadt – Vocals, Background Vocals
Emmylou Harris – Vocals, Acoustic Guitar, Electric Guitar, Background Vocals
Neil Young – Harmonica, Background Vocals
Andy Fairweather Low – Bass Guitar, Electric Guitar, Background Vocals
Ethan Johns – Dulcimer, Synthesizer, Acoustic Guitar, Guitar, Percussion, Drums, Electric Guitar, Slide Guitar, Mandocello, Spanish guitar, Synthesizer Bass, Optigan
Paul Wickens – Accordion
Paul Kennerley – Electric Guitar, Background Vocals
Bernie Leadon – Acoustic Guitar, Mandolin, Bass Guitar, Electric Guitar, Guitarron, Mandocello, 6-string bass, Synthesizer Bass, Guitar (12 String Electric)
Greg Leisz – Acoustic Guitar, Mandolin, Pedal Steel Guitar, Bass Guitar, Electric Guitar, Background Vocals, Mandola, Mandocello, Weissenborn
Anna McGarrigle – Background Vocals
Helen Watson – Background Vocals
Kate McGarrigle – Background Vocals
Michel Pepin – Cymbals, Bass Guitar
Samantha Rowe – Cello

Production
Glyn Johns – Producer, Engineer
George Massenburg – Engineer

Chart performance

References

1999 albums
Emmylou Harris albums
Linda Ronstadt albums
Vocal duet albums
Albums produced by Glyn Johns
Asylum Records albums